Imelda de' Lambertazzi is a melodramma tragico or tragic opera in two acts by Gaetano Donizetti from a libretto by Andrea Leone Tottola, based on the tragedy Imelda by Gabriele Sperduti. It received its first performance on 5 September 1830 at the Teatro San Carlo, Naples.

Performance history
The opera was not a great success and performances of it are very rare. A concert performance was given on 10 March 2007 at the Queen Elizabeth Hall in London, conducted by Mark Elder, which was recorded by Opera Rara.

Roles

Synopsis

(This is a variation of the story of Romeo and Juliet.)

Time: 16th century
Place: Bologna
 
Imelda Lambertazzi (of the family supporting the Guelfs) loves Bonifacio, heir of the Geremei (of the family supporting the Ghibellines). When Bonifacio proposes peace between the families, to be sealed by their marriage, he is met with the ire of Imelda's father and brother. When Bonifacio attempts to see Imelda, he is stabbed with a poisoned dagger by her brother. Imelda pleads for forgiveness from her father before expiring herself, having sucked the poison from Bonifacio's wound.

Recordings

References
Notes

Cited sources
Osborne, Charles, (1994),  The Bel Canto Operas of Rossini, Donizetti, and Bellini,  Portland, Oregon: Amadeus Press. 

Other sources
Allitt, John Stewart (1991), Donizetti: in the light of Romanticism and the teaching of Johann Simon Mayr, Shaftesbury: Element Books, Ltd (UK); Rockport, MA: Element, Inc.(USA)
Ashbrook, William (1982), Donizetti and His Operas, Cambridge University Press.  
Ashbrook, William (1998), "Donizetti, Gaetano" in Stanley Sadie  (Ed.),  The New Grove Dictionary of Opera, Vol. One. London: MacMillan Publishers, Inc.   
Ashbrook, William and Sarah Hibberd (2001), in  Holden, Amanda (Ed.), The New Penguin Opera Guide, New York: Penguin Putnam. .  pp. 224 – 247.
Black, John (1982), Donizetti’s Operas in Naples, 1822—1848. London: The Donizetti Society.
Loewenberg, Alfred (1970). Annals of Opera, 1597-1940, 2nd edition.  Rowman and Littlefield
Sadie, Stanley, (Ed.); John Tyrell (Exec. Ed.) (2004), The New Grove Dictionary of Music and Musicians.  2nd edition. London: Macmillan.    (hardcover).   (eBook).
 Weinstock, Herbert (1963), Donizetti and the World of Opera in Italy, Paris, and Vienna in the First Half of the Nineteenth Century, New York: Pantheon Books.

External links
 Donizetti Society (London) website
 Libretto

Operas by Gaetano Donizetti
Italian-language operas
1830 operas
Operas
Opera world premieres at the Teatro San Carlo
Operas based on plays
Operas set in Italy
Libretti by Andrea Leone Tottola